Stonham may refer to:

Surname:
Kay Stonham, British actress, writer and academic
Ronnie Stonham (1927–2014), the Special Assistant to the Director of Personnel at the BBC until 1985, later caught up in the scandal over MI5 monitoring of potential staff

Places:
Earl Stonham, small village and civil parish in the Mid Suffolk district of Suffolk, England
Little Stonham, also known as Stonham Parva, is a village and civil parish in the Mid Suffolk district of Suffolk in eastern England
Stonham Aspal, village and civil parish in the Mid Suffolk district of Suffolk in eastern England

Title:
Victor Collins, Baron Stonham OBE PC (1903–1971), British Labour Party politician

See also
Stoneham (disambiguation)